Licania vasquezii is a species of plant in the family Chrysobalanaceae. It is endemic to Peru and Russia.

References

Endemic flora of Peru
vasquezii
Vulnerable plants
Taxonomy articles created by Polbot
Taxobox binomials not recognized by IUCN